The 1908 DePaul Blue Demons football team was an American football team that represented DePaul University as an independent during the 1908 college football season. In its second season under head coach Frank Haggerty, the team compiled a 6–0–1 record and outscored all opponents by a total of 176 to 25.

Schedule

References

DePaul
DePaul Blue Demons football seasons
College football undefeated seasons
DePaul Blue Demons football